"Call Me What You Like" is a song by English indie rock band Lovejoy. It was released independently through Anvil Cat and AWAL on 10 February 2023, as the lead single from their upcoming third EP. It is their first original song since 2021. It debuted at number 32 on the UK Singles Chart.

Background and composition 
Notably "heavier than their previous album" with a "bass line that thrums viciously", the song was described by described by Sima Shakeri of the Toronto Star as "an upbeat self-deprecating tune about the anxiety and desperation of an uneven relationship". A press release called the song a "punchy lament about a confusing relationship". Frontman William Gold stated upon its release:  Gold's vocals switch "between honeyed crooning and frenetic monologuing" throughout the track. Dave Brooks of Billboard noted the song "demonstrates how much progress the group has made", citing their "surprise hooks, lyrical bridges and stop-on-a-dime change-ups" in helping find the band's voice. The writer praised the frontman's approach to songwriting, continuing "he refuses to melt into a floor puddle with a kitschy breakup song".

Music video
A music video was premiered on YouTube alongside the song's release on 10 February. It was directed by Gold and bass guitarist Ash Kabosu. Online publication The Honey Pop praised the video for encapsulating the song's meaning, starting "with a seemingly normal plane ride" before it "escalates into utter chaos".

Personnel
Lovejoy
 Ash Kabosu – bass guitar, writing
 Joe Goldsmith – lead guitar, writing
 Mark Boardman – drums, writing
 William Gold – rhythm guitar, lead vocals, writing

Additional personeel
 Mark Crew – producer
 Dan Priddy – producer
 Giovanni Versari – mastering
 Marina Totino – cover art

Charts

Release history

Notes

References

2023 songs
2023 singles
AWAL singles
Indie rock songs